Vacas (Quechua name: Wak'as, deriving from Wak'a) is a Bolivian village in the southeast of the Cochabamba Department. It is the capital of the Vacas Municipality, the second municipal section of the Arani Province. Vacas is located about 85 km far from Cochabamba and about 30 km far from Arani.

The people living in Vacas and surrounding areas are predominantly indigenous citizens of Quechuan descent. During the Inca period Vacas served as a tampu along the Inca road system that led to Inkallaqta and Pocona. Later on, during the colonial period, it was founded under the name of "Santa Bárbara de Bacas".

Vacas is situated in a rural environment in the altitudes of the Cono Sur (Southern Cone) of Cochabamba. The climate is suitable for the cultivation of potatoes, wheat, barley, broad bean and oat. Vacas is known as the "Land of the potato" (Quechua: Papaq llaqtan). The fields are prepared with the help of yokes of oxen. The cultivation of the soil is supplemented by animal husbandry of cows, sheep, pigs and hens.

Education 

As to education all types of schools are available in or next to Vacas.

 Preschool education: Guardería Sagrado Corazón de Jesús.
 Primary school: Escuela Unidad Experimental, founded in 1862
 Secondary school: Colegio Profesor Toribio Claure
 Higher education: Ismael Montes Teacher Training College (Escuela Superior de Formación de Maestros "Ismael Montes" or ESFM "Ismael Montes") (in Challwa Mayu)

Festivities 

 May 4: Santa Vera Cruz Tatala
 May or June: Corpus Christi
 June 29: Saint Peter
 July 16: Our Lady of Mount Carmel, patron saint of Bolivia
 October 15: Anniversary of Vacas Municipality
 December 4: Saint Barbara, Anniversary of Vacas

Fairs 
 April: Fish, potato and crafts fair

See also 
 Asiru Qucha
 Parqu Qucha
 Qullpa Qucha

External links
 Map of Arani Province
 Map of Vacas Municipality
 Images of Vacas
 Betty Veizaga and the group Pukaj Wayra: Aires de mi tierra (Takipayanaku)
 Radio Chiwalaki in Vacas (Spanish)
 Escuela Superior de Formación de Maestros Ismael Montes (Spanish)

Populated places in Cochabamba Department